Basilisk Games is an independent video game company based in Indianapolis, Indiana that develops video games for the Windows, Mac OS X, and Linux platforms. Currently specializing in role-playing games, the company released its first title Eschalon: Book 1 in 2007. The company consists of one full-time employee, Thomas Riegsecker, as well as several contract employees.

Games 
 Eschalon: Book 1 – Windows, Mac OS X, Linux (2007)
 Eschalon: Book II – Windows, Mac OS X, Linux (2010)
 Eschalon: Book III – Windows, Mac OS X, Linux (2014)

A free expansion exists to Book II titled Secrets Of Fathamurk. Basilisk is also developing a science fiction role-playing game that will utilize a new game engine.

Awards 
 2007 "Indie RPG of the Year" – Eschalon: Book 1 (RPGWatch)
 2007 "Indie RPG of the Year" – Eschalon: Book 1 (Gaming with Children)
 2007 "Independent RPG of the Year" Runner Up – Eschalon: Book 1 (GameBanshee)

References

External links 

Companies based in Indianapolis
Video game companies established in 2005
Video game companies of the United States
Video game development companies